The roundscale spearfish (Tetrapturus georgii) is a species of marlin native to the eastern Atlantic Ocean from Portugal to Madeira, the Canary Islands to northern Africa and the western Mediterranean Sea to Sicily. It is suspected that it may be more widespread. It is believed to inhabit open waters.

References

Fish of the Atlantic Ocean
Tetrapturus
Fish described in 1841